The Zabur is, according to Islam, the holy book of David, one of the holy books revealed by God before the Quran, alongside others such as the Tawrāh (Torah) and the Injīl (Gospel). Muslim tradition maintains that the Zabur mentioned in the Quran is the Psalms of David.

The Christian monks and ascetics of pre-Islamic Arabia may be associated in pre-Islamic Arabic poetry with texts called zabūr, which in other contexts may refer to palm leaf documents. This has been interpreted by some as referring to psalters.

Among many Christians in the Middle East and in South Asia, the word Zabur (Hindustani  (Nastaʿlīq),  (Devnagari)) is used for the Psalms of David in the Hebrew Bible.

Etymology
The Arabic word zabūr means "book" "inscription," or "writing." In early sources it may refer to South Arabian writing on palm leaves.

Much of Western scholarship sees the word zabūr in the sense "psalter" as being a conflation of Arabic zabūr, "writing", with the Hebrew word for "psalm", mizmōr or its Aramaic equivalent mazmūrā.
An alternate, less accepted origin for the title zabūr in this sense is that it is a corruption of the Hebrew zimrah meaning "song, music" or sippūr, meaning "story."

Mention in the Quran
In the Qur'an, the Zabur  is mentioned by name three times. The Qur'an itself says nothing about the Zabur specifically, except that it was revealed to Dawud and that in the Zabur is written "My servants the righteous, shall inherit the earth".

Connection to the Psalms
In the Quran, the Zabur refers to the Psalms of David. The Quran 21:105 says that in the Zabur there is a quote "the land is inherited by my righteous servants". This resembles the 29th verse of Psalm 37 which says, "The righteous shall inherit the land, and dwell therein for ever," (as translated in the King James Version of the Bible).

Ahrens supports the view that Al-Anbiya 105 is quoting from the Psalms (1930). He says that the verse in the Qur'an reads, "We have written in the Zabur after the reminder that My righteous servants shall inherit the earth." His conclusion is that this verse represents a close and rare linguistic parallel with the Hebrew Bible and, more pointedly, with Psalm 37 ascribed specifically to David (see wording in verses 9,11,29).

In Hadith
One hadith, considered valid by Muhammad al-Bukhari, says:

Ketuvim
Christian apologist Karl Gottlieb Pfander suggested that the Qur'an's reference to Zabur actually refers to the third division of the Hebrew Scriptures, known as the Writings or Ketuvim, a broader grouping of Jewish holy books encompassing the Psalms and other collections of Hebrew literature and poetry.

See also 
Scrolls of Abraham
Sabians
Sheba
Book of Psalms

References

Psalms
Islamic texts
Arabian Peninsula
Islamic terminology
David

tr:Zebur